Euplexia borbonica is a moth of the family Noctuidae. It is endemic on Réunion.

References

Euplexia
Endemic fauna of Réunion
Moths of Réunion
Moths described in 1957